Alfred Keene (14 May 1873 – 1 March 1955) was a British fencer. He competed at the 1908 and 1912 Summer Olympics.

References

External links
 

1873 births
1955 deaths
British male fencers
Olympic fencers of Great Britain
Fencers at the 1908 Summer Olympics
Fencers at the 1912 Summer Olympics
Sportspeople from Kensington
Sportspeople from London